Enemy of the Law is a 1945 American Western film written and directed by Harry L. Fraser. The film stars Tex Ritter, Dave O'Brien, Guy Wilkerson, Kay Hughes, Jack Ingram and Charles King. The film was released on May 7, 1945, by Producers Releasing Corporation.

Plot

Cast          
Tex Ritter as Tex Haines
Dave O'Brien as Dave Wyatt
Guy Wilkerson as Panhandle Perkins
Kay Hughes as Ruby Lawson 
Jack Ingram as Steve Martin
Charles King as Charley Gray 
Frank Ellis as Red
Kermit Maynard as Mike
Henry Hall as Sheriff

See also
The Texas Rangers series:
 The Rangers Take Over (1942)
 Bad Men of Thunder Gap (1943)
 West of Texas (1943)
 Border Buckaroos (1943)
 Fighting Valley (1943)
 Trail of Terror (1943)
 The Return of the Rangers (1943)
 Boss of Rawhide (1943)
 Outlaw Roundup (1944)
 Guns of the Law (1944)
 The Pinto Bandit (1944)
 Spook Town (1944)
 Brand of the Devil (1944)
 Gunsmoke Mesa (1944)
 Gangsters of the Frontier (1944)
 Dead or Alive (1944)
 The Whispering Skull (1944)
 Marked for Murder (1945)
 Enemy of the Law (1945)
 Three in the Saddle (1945)
 Frontier Fugitives (1945)
 Flaming Bullets (1945)

References

External links
 

1945 films
1940s English-language films
American Western (genre) films
1945 Western (genre) films
Producers Releasing Corporation films
Films directed by Harry L. Fraser
American black-and-white films
Films with screenplays by Harry L. Fraser
1940s American films